is a railway station in the city of Tochigi, Tochigi, Japan, operated by the private railway operator Tobu Railway. The station is numbered "TN-13".

Lines 

Station layout
This station consists of two opposed side platforms serving two tracks, connected to the station building by a footbridge.

Platforms

Adjacent stations

History 
Kassemba Station opened on 1 April 1929.

From 17 March 2012, station numbering was introduced on all Tobu lines, with Kassemba Station becoming "TN-13".

Passenger statistics
In fiscal 2019, the station was used by an average of 347 passengers daily (boarding passengers only).

Surrounding area
 Kassemba Post Office

See also
 List of railway stations in Japan

References

External links

 Kassemba Station information 

Railway stations in Tochigi Prefecture
Stations of Tobu Railway
Railway stations in Japan opened in 1929
Tobu Nikko Line
Tochigi, Tochigi